Stelios Tatasopoulos (1908 - 13 July 2000) was a Greek film director and producer. He contributed to over twenty films from 1932 to 1972 including the 1932 film Social Decay.

References

External links 

1908 births
2000 deaths
Greek film directors
Greek film producers
Constantinopolitan Greeks
Emigrants from the Ottoman Empire to Greece
Film people from Athens
Film people from Istanbul
Greek male silent film actors